Manangkari (Maung language), also known as Naragani, is an extinct Australian aboriginal language once spoken in the Cobourg Peninsula, Northern Territory. Manangkari belongs to the Iwaidjan family of languages, and may be a dialect of Maung.

Consonant inventory

Like most Iwaidjan languages, but unlike Marrgu, Manangkari does not have a laminal dental series.

Vowels
Evans (1998) briefly discusses vowels in his paper noting that Iwaidjan languages including Manangkari have a three vowel ( /a/, /i/, /u/) system typical of most Australian languages.

References

Iwaidjan languages
Extinct languages